Familly is a former commune in the Calvados department in the Normandy region in northwestern France. On 1 January 2016, it was merged into the new commune of Livarot-Pays-d'Auge.

Demographics (human population)

History
The Duke of Monmouth attended school here.

See also
 Communes of the Calvados department

References

External links 
 

Former communes of Calvados (department)
Calvados communes articles needing translation from French Wikipedia
Populated places disestablished in 2016